Melrose Park is a suburban community and census-designated place (CDP) in Cayuga County, New York, United States. The population was 2,294 at the 2010 census. It is a suburb of Auburn, located south of the city in the town of Owasco.

Geography
Melrose Park is located in the northwest corner of Owasco at  (42.912071, -76.538289).

Demographics

As of the census of 2000, there were 2,359 people, 908 households, and 698 families residing in the CDP. The population density was 630.1 per square mile (243.5/km2). There were 931 housing units at an average density of 248.7/sq mi (96.1/km2). The racial makeup of the CDP was 98.73% White, 0.13% African American, 0.68% Asian, 0.13% from other races, and 0.34% from two or more races. Hispanic or Latino of any race were 0.42% of the population.

There were 908 households, out of which 35.7% had children under the age of 18 living with them, 66.6% were married couples living together, 7.4% had a female householder with no husband present, and 23.1% were non-families. 20.8% of all households were made up of individuals, and 12.1% had someone living alone who was 65 years of age or older. The average household size was 2.59 and the average family size was 2.99.

In the CDP, the population was spread out, with 25.6% under the age of 18, 5.5% from 18 to 24, 26.5% from 25 to 44, 25.9% from 45 to 64, and 16.6% who were 65 years of age or older. The median age was 41 years. For every 100 females, there were 95.6 males. For every 100 females age 18 and over, there were 91.6 males.

The median income for a household in the CDP was $51,600, and the median income for a family was $60,000. Males had a median income of $42,857 versus $28,472 for females. The per capita income for the CDP was $22,724. About 1.2% of families and 3.4% of the population were below the poverty line, including 2.3% of those under age 18 and 2.8% of those age 65 or over.

References

Census-designated places in New York (state)
Census-designated places in Cayuga County, New York